The Football tournament at the 1952 Summer Olympics was won by Hungary.

The games signalled the arrival (to Western Europeans at least) of the Hungarian national football team – the "Magical Magyars". Ferenc Puskás later said of the 1952 competition: "It was during the Olympics that our football first started to flow with real power." It was during the Games that Stanley Rous of English Football Association invited the Hungarians to play a friendly at Wembley the following year.

Venues

Squads

Final tournament

Preliminary round
The preliminary round saw Hungary record a narrow victory against Romania, whilst there was an 8–0 victory for Italy against the United States, and a 5–1 victory for Brazil against The Netherlands. Great Britain succumbed to Luxembourg 5–3, whilst Egypt defeated Chile 5–4. Yugoslavia were drawn against the Indians and won 10–1.

First round
The first round saw Scandinavian countries join the competition; the hosts Finland were beaten 3–4 by Austria, whilst Sweden defeated neighbours Norway 4–1. The game of the round was between Yugoslavia and the Soviet Union; Yugoslavia had been 5–1 ahead with 30 minutes of the match to go, only for the Soviet captain Bobrov to score a hat-trick and inspire his team to an eventual 5–5 draw. A replay resulted in a 3–1 victory for Yugoslavia; the Soviet side had been expected by Moscow to win the 1952 Games, and their defeat by Yugoslavia was not mentioned in the Soviet press until after Stalin's death the following year.

Quarterfinals
Sweden defeated Austria to ensure a Scandinavian presence in the semifinals. Germany surprisingly beat Brazil 4–2 after extra time, whilst Yugoslavia won comfortably in a 5–3 defeat of Denmark. Hungary demolished Turkey 7–1 to complete the four semifinalists.

Semifinals
In the first semifinal, Hungary saw off Sweden with a comprehensive 6–0 victory, whilst Yugoslavia beat Germany 3–1 to set up a Hungary-Yugoslavia final.

Bronze-medal match
There was some consolation for the Scandinavian countries as Sweden defeated Germany 2–0 in the third place play-off to secure the bronze medal.

Gold-medal match
Two goals from Puskás and Zoltán Czibor saw Hungary beat Yugoslavia and take the gold medal.

Bracket

Medalists

Goalscorers 
7 goals

  Branko Zebec (Yugoslavia)

6 goals

  Sándor Kocsis (Hungary)
  Rajko Mitić (Yugoslavia)

5 goals

  Vsevolod Bobrov (Soviet Union)

4 goals

  Larry (Brazil)
  El-Sayed El-Dhizui (Egypt)
  Willi Schröder (Germany)
  Péter Palotás (Hungary)
  Ferenc Puskás (Hungary)
  Tihomir Ognjanov (Yugoslavia)

3 goals

  Aredio Gimona (Italy)
  Joseph Roller (Luxembourg)
  Yngve Brodd (Sweden)
  Ingvar Rydell (Sweden)
  Stjepan Bobek (Yugoslavia)
  Zlatko Čajkovski (Yugoslavia)
  Bernard Vukas (Yugoslavia)

2 goals

  Otto Gollnhuber (Austria)
  Herbert Grohs (Austria)
  Humberto Tozzi (Brazil)
  Irenio Jara (Chile)
  Julio Vial (Chile)
  Poul Erik Petersen (Denmark)
  Holger Seebach (Denmark)
  Olof Stolpe (Finland)
  Karl Klug (Germany)
  Zoltán Czibor (Hungary)
  Egisto Pandolfini (Italy)
  Julien Gales (Luxembourg)
  Vasili Trofimov (Soviet Union)

1 goal

  Erich Stumpf (Austria)
  Jansen (Brazil)
  Vavá (Brazil)
  Zózimo (Brazil)
  Ivan Petkov Kolev (Bulgaria)
  Jens Peter Hansen (Denmark)
  Knud Lundberg (Denmark)
  Svend Nielsen (Denmark)
  Khamal Ahmed Elfar (Egypt)
  Mechaury (Egypt)
  Aulis Rytkönen (Finland)
  Michel Leblond (France)
  Georg Stollenwerk (Germany)
  Johann Zeitler (Germany)
  Jim Lewis (Great Britain)
  George Robb (Great Britain)
  Bill Slater (Great Britain)
  Pavlos Emmanouilidis (Greece)
  József Bozsik (Hungary)
  Nándor Hidegkuti (Hungary)
  Mihály Lantos (Hungary)
  Ahmed Mohammed Khan (India)
  Alberto Fontanesi (Italy)
  Amos Mariani (Italy)
  Arcadio Venturi (Italy)
  Léon Letsch (Luxembourg)
  Joannes van Roesell (Netherlands)
  Jan Briezen (Netherlands Antilles)
  Odd Wang Sørensen (Norway)
  Jerzy Krasówka (Poland)
  Kazimierz Trampisz (Poland)
  Ion Suru (Romania)
  Aleksandr Petrov (Soviet Union)
  Sylve Bengtsson (Sweden)
  Gösta Löfgren (Sweden)
  Gösta Sandberg (Sweden)
  Tekin Bilge (Turkey)
  Ercument Guder (Turkey)
  Muzaffer Tokaç (Turkey)

Own goal
  Gösta Lindh (Sweden, against Hungary)

Soviet Union vs Yugoslavia 
The first meeting between the Soviet Union and Yugoslavia is still the most famous one. On the political level, the Soviet leader Joseph Stalin and the Yugoslav leader Josip Broz Tito split in 1948, which resulted in Yugoslavia being excluded from the Communist Information Bureau. The origin of the conflict was Tito's refusal to submit to Stalin's interpretations and visions of politics and in process becoming a Soviet satellite state. Before the match, both Tito and Stalin sent telegrams to their national teams, which showed just how important it was for the two head of states. Yugoslavia led 5–1, but a Soviet comeback in the last 15 minutes resulted in a 5–5 draw. The match was replayed, Yugoslavia winning 3–1. The defeat to the archrivals hit Soviet football hard, and after just three games played in the season, CDKA Moscow, who had made up most of the USSR squad, was forced to withdraw from the league and later disbanded. Furthermore, Boris Arkadiev, who coached both USSR and CDKA, was stripped of his Merited Master of Sports of the USSR title.

References

External links

Olympic Football Tournament Helsinki 1952, FIFA.com
RSSSF Archive

 
1952
1952 Summer Olympics events
1952 in association football
1952
1952 in Finnish football